Arthur's Hallowed Ground is a 1983 British TV film directed by Freddie Young.

Cast
Jimmy Jewel
Vas Blackwood
Jean Boht
David Swift
Bernard Gallagher
Michael Elphick
Derek Benfield
John Flanagan
Sam Kelly
Al Ashton
Mark Drewry
Paul McClean
Ron Forfar

Production
Goldcrest Films invested £319,000 in the film and earned £265,000 causing them a loss of £54,000.

References

External links
Arthur's Hallowed Ground at Letterbox
Review at Los Angeles Times
Review at New York Times
Arthur's Hallowed Ground at IMDb

1983 television films
1983 films